Denison Township may refer to the following townships in the United States:

 Denison Township, Lawrence County, Illinois
 Denison Township, Crawford County, Iowa